Tawny (also called tenné) is a light brown to brownish-orange color.

Etymology
The word means "tan-colored", from Anglo-Norman tauné "associated with the brownish-yellow of tanned leather", from Old French tané "to tan hides", from Medieval Latin tannare, from tannum "crushed oak bark", used in tanning leather, probably from a Celtic source (e.g. Breton tann, "oak tree").

Electronic definitions of tawny
A digitized version of the 1912 book Color Standards And Color Nomenclature lists tawny as AE6938, tawny-olive as 826644 or 967117, ochraceous-tawny as BE8A3D or 996515, and vinaceous-tawny as B4745E.

HP Labs' Online Color Thesaurus, which lists colors found through their Color Naming Experiment, gives tawny as CC7F3B, noting it is "rarely used", and lists its synonyms as: light chocolate, caramel, light brown, and camel.

Dictionary of Color lists tawny as AE6938 or A67B5B, and tawny birch as A87C6D, A67B5B or 958070. It also lists "lion tawny" (which it also refers to as just "lion") as C19A6B or 826644. Orange tawny is listed as CB6D51.

Resene RGB Values List includes "Resene Tawny Port" as 105, 37, 69 (#692545), while Resene-2007-rgb lists tawny port as 100, 58, 72 (#643A48).

While tan is defined since HTML4 and elsewhere, the color names tawny, tenné and fulvous do not appear in the standard web colors used by HTML, CSS, and SVG. Most standard X11 color name files also do not have these names. However, many color lists include "Tenné (Tawny)" as #CD5700.

The proprietary Pantone TC color system includes Tawny Olive, Tawny Birch, Tawny Brown, Tawny Orange, and Tawny Port. It also has several shades of tan: Apricot Tan, Copper Tan, Rose Tan, Tan, Pastel Rose Tan, and Indian Tan.

The color burnt orange, having the hex number CC5500, is sometimes considered to be a close approximation to tawny. The color tan may also be considered synonymous with tawny, or a different shade: #D2B48C. Fulvous, meaning tawny-colored, may also be considered synonymous or its own shade.

Swatches 

Related colors

Synonyms

Colors listed as synonyms by HP Labs' Online Color Thesaurus.

Variations

See also
 Fulvous
 Tan (color)
 Tenné, the color used in heraldry
 Lion (color)
 Camel (color)
 Fallow (color)
 List of colors
 Buff (colour)

References

Shades of brown
Shades of orange